Paul-Marie Delaunay (16 February 1878 – 3 February 1958) was a French physician and historian.

1878 births
1958 deaths
20th-century French physicians